The Royal Heroine Stakes is a Grade II American Thoroughbred horse race for fillies and mares that are four years old or older, over a distance of one mile on the turf held annually in April at Santa Anita Park, Arcadia, California.  The event currently carries a purse of $200,000.

History
The event was named in honor of the great Champion filly, Royal Heroine, who won the inaugural running of the Breeders' Cup Mile at Hollywood Park Racetrack in North American record time.

The event was inaugurated on 12 December 1986 as the Royal Heroine Handicap held at Hollywood Park Racetrack for three year old fillies over the  miles distance and was won by Mary Jones Bradley's Miraculous who was ridden by US Hall of Fame jockey Gary Stevens and trained by US Hall of Fame trainer Charles E. Whittingham in a time of 1:41. 

After an absence of 11 years, the event was renewed on 18 July 1998  as the Royal Heroine Stakes over the one mile distance with conditions for fillies and mares, three years old and older and was won by French bred mare Tuzla who won by a neck defeating the favorite Sonja's Faith (IRE) and four other runners in a time of 1:34.33. The following year, Tuzla would start the favorite and repeat winning by three-quarters of a length.

In 2001 the event was upgraded to a Grade III event.

In 2006 with the influx of sponsorship dollars from CashCall the events purse was raised to $750,000 and renamed to the CashCall Mile Stakes.

In 2007 the event was upgraded to a Grade II event and was an invitational event which reflected in the name. The sponsorship of CashCall ended in 2009 and the event was changed to the Royal Heroine Mile Stakes.

In 2014 with the closure of Hollywood Park Racetrack the event was moved to Santa Anita Park and scheduled in June. The conditions of the event in 2016 changed so that three year old fillies were not included.

In 2020 due to the COVID-19 pandemic in the United States, Santa Anita closed their track and the event was cancelled

Records
Speed record: 
 1 mile: 1:33.33 –  Dance in the Mood (JPN) (2006)

Margins: 
  lengths – Vasilika (2019)

Most wins:
 2 – Tuzla (FR) (1998, 1999)

Most wins by an owner:
 2 – David Milch  (1998, 1999)
 2 – Jerry Hollendorfer  (2014, 2019)

Most wins by a jockey:
 4 – Corey Nakatani (1998, 1999, 2003, 2017)

Most wins by a trainer:
 3 – Julio C. Canani (1998, 1999, 2000)
 3 – Philip D'Amato (2015, 2021, 2022)

Winners

See also
 List of American and Canadian Graded races

References

Graded stakes races in the United States
Grade 2 stakes races in the United States
Horse races in California
Open mile category horse races
Turf races in the United States
Santa Anita Park
Sports competitions in Los Angeles County, California
1986 establishments in California
Recurring sporting events established in 1986